Chile competed at the 2022 World Games held in Birmingham, United States from 7 to 17 July 2022. Athletes representing Chile won two silver medals and one bronze medal. The country finished in 55th place in the medal table.

Medalists

Competitors
The following is the list of number of competitors in the Games.

Archery

Chile competed in archery.

Boules sports 

Chile competed in boules sports.

Canoe marathon

Chile competed in canoe marathon.

Dancesport

Chile competed in dancesport.

Fistball

Chile competed in fistball.

Karate

Chile competed in karate.

Racquetball

Chile competed in racquetball.

Road speed skating

Chile competed in road speed skating.

Sport climbing

Chile competed in sport climbing.

Track speed skating

Chile won two silver medals in track speed skating.

Water skiing

Chile won one bronze medal in water skiing.

Wushu

Chile competed in wushu.

References

Nations at the 2022 World Games
2022
World Games